The Wierland County ( or , ,) was one of the four counties of the Russian Empire located in the Governorate of Estonia. It was situated in the eastern part of the governorate (in present-day northeastern Estonia). Its capital was Rakvere (Wesenberg). The territory of Kreis Wierland corresponds to most parts of the present-day Ida-Viru and Lääne-Viru counties and a small part of Jõgeva County.

Demographics
At the time of the Russian Empire Census of 1897, Kreis Wierland had a population of 120, 230. Of these, 90.3% spoke Estonian, 7.2% Russian, 1.9% German, 0.1% Polish, 0.1% Yiddish, 0.1% Latvian and 0.1% Finnish as their native language.

References

Wierland
Uezds of Estland Governorate